Extra Arena (previous called Ranheim Stadion) is the home ground of the Norwegian football club Ranheim Fotball. It is located in the city-area of Ranheim in the city of Trondheim. The stadion had to be enlarged to comply with Eliteserien guideline of a minimum of 3000 seats.

History
The construction of grass pitch at the stadium was completed in 1939 at a cost of NOK 8,000. The stadium had to be rebuilt after World War II. 5,000 spectators visited the reconstructed stadium at the first official post-war game against Vålerengen in 1946.

Extra Arena is a part of a larger sports facility complex named Ranheim Idrettspark. Planning of a redevelopment of Ranheim Idrettspark was made in 2005, but due to Ranheim Fotball's promotion to the second tier (1. divisjon) in 2009 season, Trondheim Municipality wanted to speed up the process and finance an upgrade of Ranheim Idrettspark, e.g. a new artificial pitch with an underground heating system. This was an important step in Ranheim's stadium redevelopment needed to meet NFF's requirements for football stadiums in the two highest divisions. Ranheim Fotball itself organised the expansion of the stands with approximately 1,000 seats under roof and new floodlights facilitated for TV broadcasting. The completion of the redevelopment was scheduled to 10 July 2010, in time of Ranheim's first home game after the summer break in the 2010 season., but was not finished until later that season. Provisional stands with a total capacity of 750 seats was mounted by volunteers, which increased the total capacity to 2,000 seats. The renovated arena was first used on 11 July 2010 in a 1. divisjon game Ranheim lost 1–3 against Løv-Ham. 656 spectators paid to follow the match. However, the official opening of the new arena was held on 26 September 2010.

Ahead of the 2016 season, a new section of seated stands was built. The stand has a capacity of 1,500 spectators, which increased the total capacity to 3,000, including provisional stands. 3,000 is the minimum number of seated capacity required in Eliteserien. The total cost of the stand was NOK 80 million.

Naming rights
On 5 July 2010, Ranheim presented DNB ASA as their new main sponsor and announced that the naming rights of the stadium was sold to DNB. The new name of the stadium became DnB NOR Arena.

In March 2017, the stadium's naming rights were sold in a six-year deal to Norwegian cooperative Coop Norge who wanted to use the stadium name to brand Extra, their discount supermarket chain.

Attendance

References

External links

 EXTRA Arena - Nordic Stadiums

Football venues in Norway
Eliteserien venues
Sports venues in Trondheim
DNB ASA
Ranheim Fotball